Leif Thorsen is a Canadian former offensive guard for the BC Lions of the Canadian Football League (CFL). He was drafted by the Lions in the first round of the 2001 CFL Draft. He played college football at the University of Montana.

Early life and college 

Thorsen was born in Courtenay, British Columbia and lived there until the fourth grade. He played high school football at Flathead High School in Kalispell, Montana. Thorsen then played college football at the University of Montana where he was a three-year starter at right guard. He became a two-time honorable mention All-Big Sky Conference selection.

Professional career 

Thorsen was chosen eighth overall by the BC Lions in the first round of the 2001 CFL Draft. He played for the team for one season before retiring from football.

External links 

 University of Montana Bio
 CFL Statistics

References 

BC Lions players
Players of American football from Montana
People from Courtenay, British Columbia